In general, exponentiation fails to be commutative. However, the equation  holds in special cases, such as

History 
The equation  is mentioned in a letter of Bernoulli to Goldbach (29 June 1728).
The reply by Goldbach (31 January 1729) contains general solution of the equation, obtained by substituting  A similar solution was found by Euler.

The problem was discussed in a number of publications. In 1960, the equation was among the questions on the William Lowell Putnam Competition, which prompted Alvin Hausner to extend results to algebraic number fields.

Positive real solutions 
Main source:
Requiring that some points also satisfy the equation , means that , and by comparing exponents, . The case of  corresponds to the solution .

The following treatment explores some special cases and notes linkages to other mathematical concepts.

An infinite set of trivial solutions in positive real numbers is given by  Nontrivial solutions can be written explicitly as

 

Here,  and   represent the negative and principal branches of the Lambert W function.

Nontrivial solutions can be more easily found by assuming  and letting 
Then

Then nontrivial solutions in positive real numbers are expressed as the parametric equation
 
 

Setting  or  generates the nontrivial solution in positive integers, 

The parameterization above leads to a geometric property of this curve.

The trivial and non-trivial solutions intersect when . This is most conveniently done by substituting  and letting , so

As , the nontrivial solution asymptotes to the line . A more complete asymptotic form is

Other real solutions 
These are provided by the above parameterization when the values generated are real. For example,  is a solution (using the real cube root of ). Similarly an infinite set of discrete solutions is given by the trivial solution  for  when  is real; for example .

Similar graphs

Equation  
The curve also terminates at (0, 1) and (1, 0), instead of continuing on to infinity.

The curved section can be written explicitly as

This equation describes the isocline curve where power functions have slope 1, analogous to the geometric property of  described above.

Equation  
The equation  produces a graph where the curve and line intersect at (1, 1). The curve becomes asymptotic to 0, as opposed to 1; it is, in fact, the positive section of y = 1/x.

References

External links 
 
 
 
 

Diophantine equations
Recreational mathematics